Laem Thong (เทศบาลตำบลแหลมทอง) is a subdistrict municipality (Thesaban Tambon) in Nong Bun Mak District, Nakhon Ratchasima Province, Thailand. It became a municipality effective July 18, 2008. The TAO was created in 1996, covers 69.22 km2, ten villages and 5,667 citizens.

Thesaban of Nakhon Ratchasima Province